Lawrence Ward may refer to:
Lawrence Ward (Serjeant-at-Arms) (born 1968), a security expert who started his professional career with Royal Mail
Lawrence M. Ward, a neuroscientist and psychophysicist at the Department of Psychology at the University of British Columbia